Arizona v. Maricopa County Medical Society, 457 U.S. 332 (1982), was a U.S. Supreme Court case involving antitrust law. A society of doctors in Maricopa County, Arizona, established maximum fees that their members could claim for seeing patients who were covered by certain health insurance plans. Arizona charged them with violations of state antitrust law regarding price fixing. The society tried to rebut the state's charges by claiming that the maximum-fee arrangement was necessary to allow doctors to see these patients, and therefore generated economic benefits. 

On appeal, the Supreme Court rejected this defense, saying that price fixing was not truly necessary here: the society could have used insurance to pool their risk. The society's efficiency justification was either a pretext, or else could have been done through less restrictive means. The Court held that their justifications failed as a matter of fact.

Facts
Maricopa County Medical Society, by agreement of their member doctors, established the maximum fees the doctors may claim in full payment for health services provided to policyholders of specified insurance plans. Arizona filed a complaint against MCMS in Federal District Court, alleging that they were engaged in an illegal price-fixing conspiracy in violation of the Sherman Antitrust Act.

Judgment
In a 4–3 decision, the court held that the maximum fee agreements, as price-fixing agreements, are per se unlawful under § 1 of the Sherman Act.

Significance
The ruling stipulates not just that maximum price fixing among competitors is unlawful, but that it is unlawful per se. This precludes any significant inquiry into potential procompetitive justifications for such an arrangement. According to one author, the result of the decision was to make "antitrust analysis once again confused and haphazard."

See also

US antitrust law
List of United States Supreme Court cases, volume 457
Kiefer-Stewart Co. v. Seagram & Sons, Inc.
Albrecht v. Herald Co.

Notes

References
.
.

External links
 

1982 in United States case law
United States antitrust case law
United States Supreme Court cases
United States Supreme Court cases of the Burger Court
History of Maricopa County, Arizona
1982 in Arizona
Legal history of Arizona
American Medical Association